Harlene Maclang Bautista is a Filipina former child star, film and television actress, film producer and businesswoman in the Philippines.

In 1989, Bautista won the FAP Award for Best Supporting Actress for Gawa Na ang Bala Na Papatay sa Iyo starring Fernando Poe Jr.

Career
Bautista appeared as child star in films like Oh, My Mama (1981) with Maricel Soriano, Ten Little Indians (1981) with William Martinez, Dear God (1982) with Alma Moreno and Lukaret (1983) with Irma Alegre. She was nominated for FAMAS Award as Best Child Actress for Broken Marriage (1983).

She also became a member of That's Entertainment Thursday Group during her teenage along with Vina Morales, Jennifer Sevilla, Keempee de Leon and Smokey Manaloto, among others.

She also did movies such as Anak ng Demonyo (1989) with Ian Veneracion, Kunin Mo Ang Ulo Ni Ismael (1990) with Jestoni Alarcon, and she played as the daughter of Fernando Poe Jr. in Dito sa Pitong Gatang (1992) with Nanette Medved.

Bautista became the producer of movies like Umaaraw, Umuulan (2006), Burgos (2013) with Lorna Tolentino, directed by Joel Lamangan, and Raketeros (2013) with Herbert Bautista, Ogie Alcasid, Andrew E. and Joey Marquez, directed by Randy Santiago.

Personal life
Her parents are Rosario Bautista and actor-director Herminio 'Butch' Bautista. She is the sister of actors Herbert Bautista (served as Mayor of Quezon City) and Hero Bautista.

She was married to actor Romnick Sarmenta. On October 5, 2018, Bautista announced their separation from the marriage.

Filmography

Film
Oh, My Mama (1981)
Ten Little Indians (1981)
Ambrocio Defontorum (1981)
Dear God (1982)
Lukaret (1983)
Broken Marriage (1983)
Baby Tsina (1984)
Ride on Baby (1985)
Escort Girls (1985)
Mga Kwento ni Lola Basyang (1985)
Rocky Four-Ma (1986)
Isang Kumot Tatlong Unan (1986)
Tu-Yay and His Magic Payong (1986)
Hiwaga sa Balete Drive (1988)
Hindi Tao, Hindi Hayop: Adventures of Seiko Jewels (1988)
Gawa Na ang Bala Na Papatay sa Iyo (1988)
One Two Bato, Three Four Bapor (1988)
Walang Panginoon (1989)
Anak ng Demonyo (1989)
Kunin Mo ang Ulo ni Ismael (1990)
Dito sa Pitong Gatang (1992)
Sa Paraiso ni Efren (1999)
Live Show (2000)
Nars (2007)

Television
That's Entertainment (TV series) (1986)
357 Kamagong (TV series; 1988)
May Bukas Pa (1999-2001)
Sa Dulo ng Walang Hanggan (2001-2003)
Bituin (2002-2003)
Saang Sulok ng Langit (2005)
Home Boy (2006)
Ikaw Sana (2009-2010)
First Time (2010)
Walang Tulugan with the Master Showman (2016)

References

External links

Year of birth missing (living people)
Living people
Actresses from Metro Manila
People from Quezon City
That's Entertainment (Philippine TV series)
That's Entertainment Thursday Group Members
GMA Network personalities
ABS-CBN personalities